GDM may refer to:

 Desportivo Maputo, a Mozambican football club
 Gardner Municipal Airport (Massachusetts)
 Giardini di Mirò, an Italian rock band
 Gesellschaft für Didaktik der Mathematik
 Gestational diabetes mellitus
 Gibraltar Democratic Movement
 GNOME Display Manager
 Gold Decoration for Merit, an honour of South Africa
 Gradient discretisation method
 Greyhound Mexico